Qeshlaq-e Esmail Khan Mohammad Izadi (also Romanized as Qeshlāq-e Esmāʿīl Khān Moḩammad Īzadī) is a village in Qeshlaq-e Sharqi Rural District, Qeshlaq Dasht District, Bileh Savar County, Ardabil Province, Iran. At the 2006 census, its population was 60, in 15 families.

References 

Towns and villages in Bileh Savar County